Harry Stanley may refer to:

 Shooting of Harry Stanley, death of a man shot by police in London in 1999
 Harry Stanley (cricketer) (1888–1934), English cricketer
 Harry Stanley (magician), proprietor of the Unique Magic Studio in London
 H. Eugene Stanley (born 1941), American physicist

See also
 Henry Stanley (disambiguation)
 Harold Stanley, American businessman